Fudbalski klub Partizan is a professional football club based in Belgrade, Serbia. The club was formed in 1945.

Seasons

1 The club were docked two points.

References

External links
 Official website
 Partizanopedia Unofficial website, about history and statistics of FK Partizan (in Serbian)

 
Partizan